Alakan (also Romanized as Ālākān and Alākān; also known as Ālkān) is a village in Babuyi Rural District, Basht District, Basht County, Kohgiluyeh and Boyer-Ahmad Province, Iran. At the 2006 census, its population was 72, in 15 families.

References 

Populated places in Basht County